This is a list of major annual events in China.

See also
 Culture of China
 Traditional Chinese holidays
 Public holidays in China

References

Chinese culture
Annual events
 
Annual
China